Dorset & Wilts 2 South is an English Rugby Union league, forming part of the South West Division, for clubs primarily based in Dorset, sitting at tier 9 of the English rugby union system.  Promoted teams tend to move up to Dorset & Wilts 1 South.  Relegated teams used to drop to Dorset & Wilts 3 South but since that division was cancelled at the end of the 2018–19 season there has been no relegation.  Each year 1st XV clubs in this division also take part in the RFU Junior Vase, a level 9–12 national competition.

2021-22

Dorset Dockers and East Dorset (11th in 2019-20) merged ahead of the current season to form East Dorset Dockers.

North Dorset II, Salisbury III and Wheatsheaf Cabin Crew did not return as all were level transferred to the newly formed Dorset & Wilts 2 Central for the current season.

2020–21
Due to the COVID-19 pandemic, the 2020–21 season was cancelled.

2019–20

2018–19

2017–18

2016–17
Bridport
Bournemouth IV
Dorchester II
Ellinghan & Ringwood II
Dorset Dockers II (promoted from Dorset & Wilts 3 South)
Lytchett Minster II (promoted from Dorset & Wilts 3 South)
New Milton II
North Dorset III
Oakmedians II
Puddletown
Salisbury III
Wheatsheaf Cabin Crew

2015–16

The 2015–16 Dorset & Wilts 2 South consisted of twelve teams; seven based in Dorset, three from Hampshire and one each from Somerset and Wiltshire. The season started on 12 September 2015 and ended on 23 April 2016.

Eight of the twelve teams participated in last season's competition. The 2014–15 champions, East Dorset were promoted to Dorset & Wilts 1 South along with Salisbury II (2nd) and Swanage & Wareham II (3rd), while North Dorset III and Wimborne III were relegated to Dorset & Wilts 3 South.

2012–13
Dorchester II
East Dorset	
Ellingham & Ringwood II	
Fordingbridge 
Frome II
New Milton II
North Dorset III
Poole	
Puddletown
Weymouth II

Original teams
When league rugby began in 1987, this division (known as Berks/Dorset/Wilts 2) contained the following teams from Berkshire, Dorset and Wiltshire:

Bradford-on-Avon
Chippenham
Corsham
Lytchett Minster
Minety
North Dorset
Oakmedians
Poole
Puddletown
Swindon College Old Boys
Supermarine
Trowbridge

Dorset & Wilts 2 South honours

Berks/Dorset/Wilts 2 (1987–1993)

Originally Dorset & Wilts 2 North and Dorset & Wilts 2 South were combined in a single division known as Berks/Dorset/Wilts 2, involving clubs based in Berkshire, Dorset and Wiltshire.  It was a tier 9 league with promotion to Berks/Dorset/Wilts 1 and, from the 1988–89 season onward, relegation was to either Berks/Dorset/Wilts 3 East or Berks/Dorset/Wilts 3 West.

Berks/Dorset/Wilts 2 (1993–1996)

The creation of National League 5 South for the 1993–94 season meant that Berks/Dorset/Wilts 2 dropped to become a tier 10 league.  Promotion continued to Berks/Dorset/Wilts 1, while relegation was now to Berks/Dorset/Wilts 3.

Berks/Dorset/Wilts 2 (1996–2000)

The cancellation of National League 5 South at the end of the 1995–96 season meant that Berks/Dorset/Wilts 2 reverted to being a tier 9 league.  Promotion continued to Berks/Dorset/Wilts 1 and relegation to Berks/Dorset/Wilts 3.

Dorset & Wilts 2 South (2000–2004)

At the end of the 1999–00 season Berks/Wilts/Dorset 2 was restructured following the departure of Berkshire clubs to join the Bucks & Oxon leagues.  It was now split into two tier 9 regional leagues - Dorset & Wilts 2 North and Dorset & Wilts 2 South.  Promotion from Dorset & Wilts 2 South was now to Dorset & Wilts 2 and there was no relegation due to the cancellation of Berks/Wilts/Dorset 3.

Dorset & Wilts 2 South (2004–2009)

Ahead of the 2004–05 season, local league restructuring meant that promotion from Dorset & Wilts 2 South was now to Dorset & Wilts 1 South (formerly Dorset & Wilts 1) and relegation to the newly introduced Dorset & Wilts 3 South (last known as Berks/Dorset/Wilts 3).  It remained a tier 9 league.

Dorset & Wilts 2 South (2009–present)

Despite widespread restructuring by the RFU at the end of the 2008–09 season, Dorset & Wilts 2 South remained a tier 9 league, with promotion continuing to Dorset & Wilts 1 South and relegation to Dorset & Wilts 3 South until that division was abolished at the end of the 2018–19 season.

Number of league titles

Blandford (2) 
Bournemouth III (2)
Bournemouth University (2)
Bridport (2)
East Dorset (2)
North Dorset (2) 
Oakmeadians II (2)
Sherborne II (2)
Aldermaston (1) 
Chippenham (1) 
Dorchester II (1)
Dorset Dockers (1)
Melksham (1)
Minety (1)
New Milton II (1)
Salisbury II (1)
Salisbury III (1)
Sherborne (1)
Supermarine (1)
Swindon College Old Boys (1)
Tadley (1)
Thatcham (1)
Trowbridge (1)
Wincanton (1)
Yeovil (1)

See also 
 South West Division RFU
 Dorset & Wilts RFU
 English rugby union system
 Rugby union in England

Notes

References 

Rugby union leagues in England
Rugby union in Dorset